Matteo Jorgenson (born July 1, 1999) is an American professional cyclist, who currently rides for UCI WorldTeam .

He had an active 2022 Tour de France and was involved in several breakaways including on stage 10, a stage where his parents were able to be in attendance. He finished fourth, a result he was not satisfied with. On stage 16 there was a large breakaway of nearly 30 riders and Jorgenson was among them. Late in the stage he was one of the final surviving riders and was in the process of chasing down the lead rider Hugo Houle. He crashed while rounding a sharp corner and when he remounted his bike he was visibly bleeding from his arm and leg. Despite the crash he was still able to finish fourth on the stage.

Major results

2017
 5th Overall Tour de l'Abitibi
 5th Overall Grand Prix Rüebliland
2018
 2nd Road race, National Under-23 Road Championships
 8th Chrono Kristin Armstrong
 9th Overall Rhône-Alpes Isère Tour
2019
 1st  Points classification, Tour de l'Avenir
 1st Stage 1 (TTT) Giro della Friuli Venezia Giulia
 4th Overall Ronde de l'Isard
 4th Trofeo Edil C
2021
 8th Overall Paris–Nice
2022
 4th Overall Tour de la Provence
 7th Mercan'Tour Classic
2023
 1st  Overall Tour of Oman
1st  Points classification
1st  Young rider classification
1st Stage 3
 8th Overall Paris–Nice

General classification results timeline

References

External links

1999 births
Living people
American male cyclists
People from Walnut Creek, California
Cyclists from California
Cyclists from Idaho